Phenylacetate may refer to:

 Phenyl acetate, the ester of phenol and acetic acid
 The conjugate base of phenylacetic acid